Mihrişah Sultan ("sun/light of the Şah";  1745 – 16 October 1805), was a consort of Sultan Mustafa III, and the mother of Selim III of the Ottoman Empire, and his Valide sultan for 16 years from 1789 until 1805.

Early life
Of ethnic Georgian origin, Mihrişah was born in 1745 in Georgia. Her original name was Agnes. She was considered beautiful, and was called "the Georgian Beauty". Another theory says that she was Genoese.

As imperial consort
Mihrişah entered in Mustafa III's harem circa 1757 and became one of his consorts and then the BaşKadin (first consort). On 17 March 1759, she gave birth to her first child, a daughter, Hibetullah Sultan. For the past thirty years no child had been born in the imperial family, hence, Hibetullah's birth was celebrated in the whole of Istanbul. 

On 24 December 1761, she gave birth to her second child, a son, Şehzade Selim (future Selim III). His birth was accompanied by celebrations that lasted a week. On 9 January 1770, she gave birth to her third child, a daughter, Fatma Sultan, who died at the age of two on 26 May 1772. Among her servants was Dilhayat Kalfa, hostess of Ahmed III's harem and tutoress of Selim III, known to be one of the greatest Turkish composeress of the early modern period. 

She was widowed in 1774, after which she settled in the Old Palace. An archival document from the Topkapi Palace shows that Mustafa III borrowed money from her and that, due to his death, the debt was not repaid.

Mihrişah and her son Selim were both members of the Mevlevi Order, which practiced Sufi whirling.

As Valide Sultan

Selim's accession and political influence

During the reign of Sultan Abdul Hamid I, which lasted for fifteen years, Şehzade Selim remained closed in the Topkapı Palace, and the Mihrişah was sent to live in the Old Palace. Upon Abdul Hamid's death in 1789, Selim ascended the throne after which Mihrişah became the Valide Sultan.

Selim had a thorough renovation of the part of the Harem circle of the Topkapı Palace for the sultans for his mother. It is rumoured that Sultan Selim went to her apartment every day, chatted and discussed the city issues. Selim was extremely fond of his mother, and Mihrişah was very influential during her mandate as Valide Sultan. She sided with the British and was hostile to the French and the Russians, and she was particularly concerned about avoiding her son's sorrow, of a nervous and anxious nature, so much so that when the French invaded Egypt she tried to hide the news from him. 

Being an emotional, calm and gentle lady, Mihrişah has made history with her religiousness and philanthropy. She supported and inspired her son's reforms and refurbished her apartments in the Baroque style, being an admirer of the European style and architecture.

She occasionally approached her son to beg a favour or an act of mercy. When he launched his Nizam-I Cedid (New Order), both Mihrişah and her Kethüda, by then Yusuf Agha, were his strong supporters. To encourage the reforms so dear to her son's heart, Mihrişah built a mosque for the Humbaracıhane (barracks of the bombardiers) at Hasköy on the Asiatic shore, and founded a school of medicine at Üsküdar.

Yusuf Agha was her second kethüda, who had replaced her first kethüda Mahmud Agha, when he died during tenure of his office. He was capable, and an intimate of Selim. He was persuaded and finally killed by the machinations of Kabakçı Mustafa in the uprising against Selim in 1808, after which his tax farm was given to Sultan Mustafa IV's mother, Sineperver Sultan.

Patron of architecture

Mihrişah was very active in the 1790s as a patron of architecure, especially schools and mosques. 

The Humbarahane Barracks, which Mihrişah founded in 1792, included ball casting facilities, training sites, a chlorine house with leather for use for various military purposes, kitchen, stables, baths, legitimate rooms, shops, and mosques. It is considered the first modern example of large-scale military buildings.

The Mihrişah Sultan Complex, which Mihrisah founded in 1792 and which was completed in 1796, is in the neighbourhood of Eyüp in Istanbul. It includes her mausoleum and an imaret (soup kitchen), today the last still-functioning Ottoman imaret.

In 1793, Mihrişah founded Halıcıoğlu Mosque.

Mihrişah was responsible for the building of the Vâlide Dam on the eastern branch of Arabacı Mandrai in Istanbul, to provide additional water supply to the Büyük Bent. 

Mihrişah also built a number of fountains:

 a fountain in Üsküdar İhsaniye in memory of her daughter Hibetullah Sultan, in 1791 
 a fountain in memory of her daughter Fatma Sultan, in 1792
 repairs on the Silahtar Yusuf Pasha Fountain in Kağıthane, in 1794
 a fountain between Eminönü and Balıkpazarı in honor of Çaşnigir Zeynep (later called Mihrişah Vâlide Fountain), in 1796 
 two fountains on either side of the sebil built for her complex Eyüp, in 1796 
 a fountain in Fındıklı Mollabayırı, in 1797 
 a fountain in Kılıçali District in Beşiktaş, in 1797 
 a fountain in memory of her daughter Fatma Sultan (later called Mihrişah Valide Sultan Fountain) in Yeniköy, Istanbul, in 1805 

Fountains built by Mihrişah met the water needs of people in the Beyoğlu, Galata and Boğaziçi neighbourhoods.

Death

Mihrişah Sultan died on 16 October 1805 from an unknown disease and was buried in her charitable complex located at Eyüp, Istanbul. Her death deeply grieved her son Selim, who wept for her for a long time.

Issue
Together with Mustafa III, Mihrişah had a son and two daughters:
Hibetullah Sultan (17 March 1759 – 7 June 1762, buried in Mustafa III Mausoleum, Laleli Mosque, Istanbul),  called also Heybetullah or Heyyibetullah, betrothed on 2 June 1759 to Mahir Hamza Pasha but died before the marriage;
Selim III (Topkapı Palace, 24 December 1761 – 28 July 1808, buried in Mustafa III Mausoleum), 28th Sultan of the Ottoman Empire. 
Fatma Sultan (9 January 1770 – 26 May 1772, buried in Mustafa III Mausoleum, Laleli Mosque, Istanbul).

In popular culture
In 1989 Swiss-American drama film The Favorite, Mihrişah is portrayed by French actress Andréa Parisy.
In 2012 Turkish miniseries Esir Sultan, Mihrişah is portrayed by Turkish actress Ipek Tenolcay.

Gallery

See also
Ottoman dynasty
Ottoman Imperial Harem
List of Valide Sultans
List of consorts of the Ottoman Sultans
List of mothers of the Ottoman sultans

References

Sources

External links

1745 births
1805 deaths
18th-century consorts of Ottoman sultans
19th-century consorts of Ottoman sultans
Valide sultan
Georgians from the Ottoman Empire